General Lord George Augustus Frederick Paget  (16 March 1818 – 30 June 1880), was a British soldier during the Crimean War who took part in the famous Charge of the Light Brigade.  He later became a Whig politician.

Early life
Lord George Augustus Frederick Paget was born on 16 March 1818.  Paget was the youngest son of Henry Paget, 1st Marquess of Anglesey by his second wife Lady Charlotte, daughter of Charles Cadogan, 1st Earl Cadogan. Among his siblings were Lady Emily (wife of John Townshend, 1st Earl Sydney), Lord Clarence Paget, Lady Mary Paget (wife of John Montagu, 7th Earl of Sandwich), Lord Alfred Paget (MP for Lichfield), and Lady Adelaide Paget (wife of Frederick William Cadogan).

He was educated at Westminster School.

His parents were both previously married, and divorced; his father to Lady Caroline Villiers (later the Duchess of Argyll), and his mother to Henry Wellesley (later 1st Baron Cowley). From his mother's previous marriage, his elder half-siblings included Hon. Charlotte Wellesley (wife of Robert Grosvenor, 1st Baron Ebury), Henry Wellesley, 1st Earl Cowley, and the Very Rev. Hon. Gerald Valerian Wellesley. From his father's previous marriage, his elder half-siblings included Lady Caroline Paget (wife of Charles Gordon-Lennox, 5th Duke of Richmond), Henry Paget, 2nd Marquess of Anglesey, Lady Jane Paget (wife of Francis Conyngham, 2nd Marquess Conyngham), Lady Georgina Paget (wife of Edward Crofton, 2nd Baron Crofton), Lady Augusta Paget (wife of Arthur Chichester, 1st Baron Templemore), Lord William Paget, and Lady Agnes Paget (wife of George Byng, 2nd Earl of Strafford).

Career

Paget served in the Crimean War and fought at Alma and Balaclava in command of the 4th (The Queen's Own) Light Dragoons. He is frequently quoted for his references to the Russian engagement in Balaklava on the Crimean Peninsula: "Every fool at the outposts, who fancies he hears something, has only to make a row, and there we all are, Generals and all... Well I suppose 500 false alarms are better than one surprise". This quote was supposedly written just before the Russians surprised the camp.  He is famous for having charged with the Light Brigade while smoking a cheroot (a type of cigar favoured by soldiers who served in India).

Member of Parliament
Apart from his military career, Paget sat in Westminster as the Member of Parliament (MP) for Beaumaris between 1847 and 1857. He was made a KCB in 1870.

Personal life

On 27 February 1854, Paget married his first cousin Agnes Charlotte Paget, daughter of Sir Arthur Paget. They had two sons.

After her death on 10 March 1858, just six days after the birth of her child, he married, secondly, Louisa Elizabeth, daughter of Charles Fieschi Heneage, in 1861.

Death
Paget died at his residence in Farm Street, Mayfair, London, in June 1880, aged 62. His widow remarried, as his third wife, to Arthur Capell, 6th Earl of Essex, in 1881. She died in January 1914.

References

External links 
 
 Brigadier General Lord George Paget C.B.: Lord George Paget (1818-1880), Colonel 4th Light Dragoons at the Library of Congress
 

British Army personnel of the Crimean War
Younger sons of marquesses
British Army generals
Whig (British political party) MPs for Welsh constituencies
4th Queen's Own Hussars officers
UK MPs 1847–1852
UK MPs 1852–1857
Members of the Parliament of the United Kingdom for Beaumaris
People educated at Westminster School, London
Knights Commander of the Order of the Bath
1818 births
1880 deaths
George